Dominic Carroll (born 15 November 1983, Amsterdam) is a retired Gibraltarian track athlete.

Notable achievements include medals at the Youth Centennial Games (organised by the International Olympic Committee to celebrate its centenary), and four medals at three Island Games. He has also competed in a number of World and European championships. In 2010 prior to the European Athletics Championships he was hailed as the "True Spirit of Barcelona 2010" and picked out as one to watch during the competition, unfortunately he was disqualified due to a false start and could not compete after falling victim to the IAAFs new one chance ruling when it came to false starts. During the years spanning 2005 to 2008 he was part of an elite training squad based in Cardiff which included Welsh athletes David Greene and Gareth Warburton, and English athlete Richard Hill, he was deemed to have the potential to match the performance levels of his fellow athletes but a series of injuries hampered his development.

International championships attended

IOC Youth Centennial Games, Aalborg, Denmark, 1996
IOC Jr Olympics, Moscow, Russia, 1998
IAAF World Youth Athletics Championships, Bydgoszcz, Poland, 1999
IIGA Island Games, Isle of Man, Great Britain, 2001
IAAF World Cross Country Championships,	Vilamoura, Portugal 2000
IAAF World Cross Country Championships,	Oostende, Belgium 2001
EAA European Athletics Championships, Munich, Germany, 2002
IIGA Island Games, Guernsey, Great Britain, 2003
IAAF World Athletics Championships, Paris, France, 2003
IIGA Island Games, Shetland Islands, Great Britain, 2005
EAA European Indoor Athletics Championships, Birmingham, Great Britain, 2007
IIGA Island Games, Rhodes, Greece, 2007
EAA European Indoor Athletics Championships, Turin, Italy, 2009
IIGA Island Games, Åland, Finland, 2009
IAAF World Athletics Championships, Berlin, Germany, 2009
EAA European Athletics Championships, Barcelona, Spain, 2010
IIGA Island Games, Isle of Wight, Great Britain, 2011
IAAF World Indoor Athletics Championships, İstanbul, Turkey, 2012
EAA European Indoor Athletics Championships, Gothenburg, Sweden, 2013
IIGA Island Games, Bermuda, 2013

References

1983 births
Living people
Gibraltarian male sprinters
Athletes from Amsterdam
World Athletics Championships athletes for Gibraltar
British male sprinters
Dutch male sprinters